Sienhachenbach is an Ortsgemeinde – a municipality belonging to a Verbandsgemeinde, a kind of collective municipality – in the Birkenfeld district in Rhineland-Palatinate, Germany. It belongs to the Verbandsgemeinde Herrstein-Rhaunen, whose seat is in Herrstein.

Geography

Location
The residential community of Sienhachenbach lies between Idar-Oberstein and Lauterecken northeast of the Baumholder troop drilling ground.

Neighbouring municipalities
Sienhachenbach borders in the north on the municipality of Schmidthachenbach, in the east on the municipality of Sien, in the south on the Baumholder troop drilling ground and in the west on the municipality of Oberreidenbach. Sienhachenbach also meets the municipality of Otzweiler at a single point in the northeast.

Constituent communities
Also belonging to Sienhachenbach is the outlying homestead of Forsthaus Antestal.

History
In 1508, Sienhachenbach had its first documentary mention.

Politics

Municipal council
The council is made up of 6 council members, who were elected by majority vote at the municipal election held on 7 June 2009, and the honorary mayor as chairman.

Mayor
Sienhachenbach’s mayor is Dietmar Fritz.

Coat of arms
The municipality’s arms might be described thus: Per bend vert in sinister a bend sinister wavy and in base a village fountain, both argent, and Or a lion rampant gules armed and langued azure.

Culture and sightseeing

Buildings
The following are listed buildings or sites in Rhineland-Palatinate’s Directory of Cultural Monuments:
 Hofgartenstraße 3 – so-called Zehnthof (“Tithe Estate”); walled estate complex, marked 1729; house marked 1823, essentially possibly from the 18th century

Community centre
In 1968, the community centre was dedicated. It is the hub of the community’s cultural life and is used by the local clubs. The Evangelical church holds services here on certain church holidays, for there is no church in the village. Often, the building, which is equipped with a small room and a large room, is used for family celebrations, public events and course offerings from the folk high school.

Clubs
 Men’s singing club (founded in 1921) and women’s choir (founded in 1987)
 Volunteer fire brigade (founded in 1939) and promotional association
 Freizeitclub e.V. (“Freedom Club”; founded in 1979)

Economy and infrastructure

Sien lies on Bundesstraße 270. Serving nearby Lauterecken is a railway station on the Lautertalbahn (Kaiserslautern–Lauterecken).

References

External links
 Brief portrait of Sienhachenbach in the SWR Fernsehen programme Hierzuland 
 Sienhachenbach in the collective municipality’s webpages 

Birkenfeld (district)